The DATAmatic 1000 is an obsolete computer system from Honeywell introduced in 1957. It uses vacuum tubes and crystal diodes for logic, and featured a unique magnetic tape format for storage.

The CPU uses a 48-bit word (plus four check bits). A word can hold 12 decimal digits (11 digits plus sign) or 8 six-bit alphanumeric characters. The system includes magnetic core storage of 2000 words or 24,000 digits in two banks, called "High-Speed Memory." Words in High-Speed Memory are also called "registers" in the documentation. The system also includes two input and two output tape buffer storage units of 62 words (744 digits) each.

The instructions are three address and all operations are storage-to-storage.

History
Datamatic Corporation was established in 1954 as a joint venture of Raytheon and Honeywell. In 1955 Honeywell bought out Raytheon's interest and the company became known as "Honeywell DATAmatic." Later Datamatic was renamed Honeywell Information Systems (HIS).

Tape format
The tape format uses 36 tracks ("channels")—31 data and 5 for checking. Data is recorded as blocks of 62 words. Within a block two words are recorded serially on each of the 31 tracks. A full reel of tape can contain 50,000 blocks (37,200,000 words). Data transfer rate is 60,000 digits per second. A DATAmatic 1000 system can attach up to 100 tape units.

When the tape is initially written data is recorded only in alternate blocks. When the end of the reel is reached the tape is recorded in reverse in previously unused blocks. This eliminates a rewind operation when reading or writing full reels. The format allows individual blocks to be rewritten in place.

Other peripherals
Standard card, paper tape, and line printer output was via offline input and output converters that wrote or read magnetic tape. Available peripheral devices included:
 Punched card reader, standard 80-column punched cards, 900 cards per minute
 Punched tape reader,  60 characters per second
 Line printer, 900 lines per minute
 Punched card output – 100 cards per minute

Staffing
Typical staffing for a DATAmatic 1000 installation (per shift) might be:
 Supervisors            1
 Analysts               5
 Programmers           11
 Coders                 2
 Clerks                 3
 Operators              2
 In-Output Operators    6
 Tape Handlers          2

(Bank of Boston, 1961)

References

External links
 A THIRD SURVEY OF DOMESTIC ELECTRONIC DIGITAL COMPUTING SYSTEMS
 Honeywell’s First Computer: The Datamatic-1000

Computer-related introductions in 1957
Vacuum tube computers
Honeywell computers
48-bit computers